Mioceratodus is an extinct genus of lungfish in the family Neoceratodontidae, which also contains the extant Queensland lungfish. It is known only from Oligocene and Miocene-aged sediments in Australia, although phylogenetic evidence supports it having first diverged from its closest relative, Neoceratodus, during the Late Jurassic or Early Cretaceous period.

4 species are known from this genus:

 †Mioceratodus anemosyrus
 †Mioceratodus diaphorus
 †Mioceratodus gregoryi
 †Mioceratodus poastrus

See also

 Sarcopterygii
 List of sarcopterygians
 List of prehistoric bony fish

References

Prehistoric lungfish genera
Oligocene fish
Miocene fish